Norphlet is a city in Union County, Arkansas, United States. As of the 2010 census the population stood at 844.

History

Norphlet was called Jesse in the 1880s. The Post Office was created in 1891. The town originally centered around William G. Miles's Sawmill. The town was named for Nauphlet Goodwin. The name of the town was misspelled by the Postal Department when the Post Office was created. The word, Nauphlet, was written in long hand and looked like Norphlet to the people in the Postal Department. So, the papers for the post office were issued for Norphlet.

Oil was discovered at Norphlet in 1922. The formation in which the oil was discovered led to 'Norphlet' becoming a geological term - a Norphlet Formation is a Jurassic Sandstone Formation.

Geography

Norphlet is located at  (33.317824, -92.663985).

Demographics

As of the census of 2000, there were 822 people, 311 households, and 236 families residing in the city. The racial make-up of the city was 94.77% White, 3.16% Black or African American, 0.36% Native American, 1.09% from other races, and 0.61% from two or more races.  2.19% of the population were Hispanic or Latino of any race.

There were 311 households, out of which 38.6% had children under the age of 18 living with them, 63.7% were married couples living together, 9.6% had a female householder with no husband present, and 24.1% were non-families. 22.2% of all households were made up of individuals, and 11.6% had someone living alone who was 65 years of age or older.  The average household size was 2.64 and the average family size was 3.11.

In the city, the population was spread out, with 28.7% under the age of 18, 7.4% from 18 to 24, 28.7% from 25 to 44, 21.9% from 45 to 64, and 13.3% who were 65 years of age or older.  The median age was 36 years. For every 100 females, there were 89.0 males.  For every 100 females age 18 and over, there were 86.0 males.

The median income for a household in the city was $39,063, and the median income for a family was $45,500. Males had a median income of $38,214 versus $23,864 for females. The per capita income for the city was $15,754.  About 7.5% of families and 10.1% of the population were below the poverty line, including 12.7% of those under age 18 and 4.2% of those age 65 or over.

Education

Public education 
Public education for early childhood, elementary and secondary school students is primarily provided by the Smackover-Norphlet School District, which includes Norphlet Elementary School, Norphlet Middle School, and Smackover High School.

The community was previously served by the Norphlet School District, which operated Norphlet Elementary School (PreK-6) and Norphlet High School (grades 7-12). On May 8, 2014 the Arkansas Board of Education (ABE) approved the merger of the Norphlet School District into the Smackover School District. For the 2014–2015 school year the original Norphlet Elementary and Norphlet High remained as-is, but for the 2015–2016 school year and beyond the former Norphlet High became a middle school for the entire district while Smackover High became the senior high school for the entire district.

Public library 
The Norphlet Public Library is a branch library of the Barton Library System, which is based in El Dorado.

References

External links
Norphlet Schools
City of Norphlet website

Cities in Union County, Arkansas
Cities in Arkansas